Deerfield is an unincorporated community in Deerfield Township, Steele County, Minnesota, United States, near Medford and Owatonna.  The community is located along NW 66th Street near NW 73rd Avenue.  Mackenzies Creek and Mud Creek both flow nearby.

References

Unincorporated communities in Steele County, Minnesota
Unincorporated communities in Minnesota